The women's 400 metres event at the 2016 Summer Olympics took place between 13–15 August at the Olympic Stadium.

Summary
Shaunae Miller of Bahamas was the world leading runner for 2016, followed by 2015 World Champion Allyson Felix. 2012 Olympic champion Sanya Richards-Ross had failed to make the American team due to a hamstring injury during the American trials.

In qualifying, 2 athletes ran under 51 seconds, American Phyllis Francis and Oluwakemi Adekoya, who ran a Bahraini record. Another Nigerian born Bahraini, 18-year-old Salwa Eid Naser,  won her heat in a personal best.

In the final, Natasha Hastings made up most of the stagger on one of the favorites, Shaunae Miller and held the lead to the halfway point. Miller made up the stagger on Stephenie Ann McPherson in lane 8 to her outside. Starting about 150 metres into the race, Miller accelerated, passing Hastings before the halfway point in the far turn.  In lane 4, Allyson Felix ran an even pace which saw her separate from the athletes inside of her and catching Shericka Jackson late in the second turn. Coming off the turn, Miller held a clear 2 metre advantage over Hastings, with Felix gaining on Hastings and Jackson more than a metre behind Felix. Hastings was passed by Felix who continued to gain on Miller.  In the last few metres as Felix gained on her, Miller started to lean forward trying to get to the finish line.  As Felix looked to pass her in the final step, Miller made a last desperate headlong dive across the line. The photo finish revealed her shoulders had crossed the line seven hundredths of a second ahead of Felix. Jamaican Shericka Jackson finished 3 metres back for bronze.		

Felix's silver became her seventh Olympic medal. She would later earn two more Olympic gold medals as part of the winning 4x100 meters and 4x400 meters teams, tying her with Merlene Ottey as the most decorated woman in track and field history, with nine Olympic medals.

Records
Prior to this competition, the existing world and Olympic records were as follows.

Schedule
All times are Brasilia Time (UTC-3)

Results

Heats
Qualification rule: First 2 in each heat (Q) and the next 8 fastest (q) advance to the Semifinals

Heat 1

Heat 2

Heat 3

Heat 4

Heat 5

Heat 6

Heat 7

Heat 8

Semifinals

Semifinal 1

Semifinal 2

Semifinal 3

Final

References

Women's 400 metres
2016
2016 in women's athletics
Women's events at the 2016 Summer Olympics